Change the Weather is the second album released by Underworld, in 1989. It contains the single 
"Stand Up", which became the band's biggest US hit, peaking at number 69 on the Billboard Hot 100 and number 14 on the Alternative Songs chart in 1989. The album peaked at number 64 on the Australian albums chart in October 1989.

Track listing 
All songs by Karl Hyde, Rick Smith and Alfie Thomas, unless noted.

Charts

References

1989 albums
Underworld (band) albums
Sire Records albums